Yurats (Yurak) was a Samoyedic language spoken in the Siberian tundra west of the Yenisei River. It became extinct in the early 19th century. Yurats was probably either a transitional variety connecting the Nenets and Enets languages of the Samoyedic family, or an archaic dialect of Enets. The uncertainty regarding the language's status is due to the scarcity of information about the language.

References

External links
UNESCO red book entry (144K)
Dictionary of the Samoyedic languages (includes Yurats) 

Northern Samoyedic languages
Extinct languages of Asia
Languages extinct in the 19th century